The 1894 Brown Bears football team represented Brown University as an independent in the 1894 college football season. Led by William G. Norton in his first and only season as head coach, Brown compiled a record of 10–5.

Schedule

References

Brown
Brown Bears football seasons
Brown Bears football